Najeeb NM (born 22 November 1976) is an Indian football manager and former player, who is the head coach of Kerala Premier League club Gokulam Kerala FC (Reserves)

Coaching career

Managerial statistics

Honours
Gokulam Kerala FC (Reservers)
Kerala Premier League: 2020–21

References

1976 births
Living people
Sportspeople from Kerala
Gokulam Kerala FC managers
Indian footballers
India international footballers
Association football player-managers
Association footballers not categorized by position